Patrick Francis McGill (1913–1977) was a journalist and nationalist politician in Ireland.

McGill was the editor-in-chief of the Ulster Herald series of newspapers, and was a Nationalist Party member of the Senate of Northern Ireland from 1953 until the body was abolished in 1972.

McGill served as the Secretary of the Irish Anti-Partition League from 1953 until its dissolution 1956, and as Secretary of the Parliamentary Nationalist Party from 1958.  During this time, he adopted a cautious approach towards modernising party structures, in contrast to Eddie McGrady.

In 1965, McGill was awarded a PhD from Queen's University Belfast, having written his thesis on The Senate in Northern Ireland, 1921-1962.  He served as a Deputy Speaker of the Senate from 1965 until its abolition.  He stood for Mid Ulster at the 1973 Northern Ireland Assembly election, but was unsuccessful.

References

Alumni of Queen's University Belfast
Members of the Senate of Northern Ireland 1953–1957
Members of the Senate of Northern Ireland 1957–1961
Members of the Senate of Northern Ireland 1961–1965
Members of the Senate of Northern Ireland 1965–1969
Members of the Senate of Northern Ireland 1969–1973
Nationalist Party (Ireland) members of the Senate of Northern Ireland
Journalists from Northern Ireland
1913 births
1977 deaths
Male non-fiction writers from Northern Ireland